Fernando Vandelli (5 April 1907 – 13 July 1977) was an Italian hammer thrower who competed at the 1932 Summer Olympics. He won a silver medal at the 1934 European Championships.

National titles
He won four national championships at individual senior level.

Italian Athletics Championships
Hammer throw: 1931, 1932, 1933, 1934

References

External links
 

1907 births
1977 deaths
Athletes (track and field) at the 1932 Summer Olympics
Italian male hammer throwers
Olympic athletes of Italy
European Athletics Championships medalists